Louis Marie Antoine Destouff de Milet de Mureau baron (26 June 1756, Toulon – 6 May 1825, Paris) was a French politician. He served as French Minister of Defence from 21 February to 2 July 1799 under the French Directory. His daughter Iphigénie became a flower painter.

References

1756 births
1825 deaths
Politicians from Toulon
French Ministers of War
18th-century French politicians